RBMedia is an audiobook publishing company with sales globally. It claims to be the largest audiobook publisher in the world. It was founded in 2017 through the acquisitions of independent audiobook companies. The companies, which now operate as imprints of RBMedia, include: Recorded Books, Tantor Media, HighBridge Audio, ChristianAudio, Gildan Media, W.F. Howes, Wavesound, GraphicAudio. It was assembled during the ownership by Shamrock Advisors (2015-2018), a private equity firm, and was created by the former publisher Recorded Books. The current owner is Kohlberg Kravis Roberts (2018). The company is headquartered in Landover, Maryland near the original Recorded Books operations. It has studios in New York and elsewhere.

History

Recorded Books
Recorded Books (later to be the "RB" in RBMedia) was founded in Maryland in 1978 and was a pioneer in the industry.

Haights Cross Communications
Recorded Books was acquired by Haights Cross Communications in December 1999, where Recorded Books operated as a division of that company. 

In May 2014, Recorded Books acquired HighBridge Audio from Workman Publishing. In January 2015, Recorded Books announced its acquisition of Tantor Media.

Shamrock Advisors
Later in 2015, Recorded Books was sold to Shamrock Advisors, a private equity firm. 

In April 2017 the company reorganized. The new company name was RBMedia and its imprints included Recorded Books, HighBridge Audio, Tantor Media, ChristianAudio, Gildan Media, W.F. Howes (UK), and Wavesound (Australia). It would sell or distribute titles directly to customers through Audiobooks.com, libraries, and resellers such as Audible.

In September 2017, it was announced Gildan Media was acquired by RBMedia. Gildan publishes business books.

In April 2017 RBMedia purchased Audiobooks.com and in October 2017 Audiobooks.com launched in the UK.

Kohlberg Kravis Roberts
In July 2018, Shamrock Advisors – who owned the company from August 2015 to July 2018 – sold it to new owners, the private equity firm Kohlberg Kravis Roberts (KKR).

In March 2020, RBMedia acquired GraphicAudio, a producer of immersive full-cast and sound-effect productions with brands such as Marvel Comics, DC Comics, Dynamite Entertainment, Vault Comics and authors such as Brandon Sanderson, Peter V. Brett, Michael J. Sullivan, R. A. Salvatore, William W. Johnstone, and Brent Weeks.

In June 2020, RBMedia sold its library assets to OverDrive, Inc.; this includes RBDigital, an app and service for the distribution of digital content. RBMedia and OverDrive are both owned by KKR, with KKR's OverDrive purchase concluded in June 2020. The sale of RBMedia's library division to OverDrive represents a merger of KKR's related assets.

In March 2021, RBMedia acquired Booka, a Barcelona-based audiobook publishing company rebranded as BookaVivo. In May 2021, RBMedia acquired McGraw-Hill Professional's audiobook business including the entire catalog of previously published titles and exclusive rights to all future titles. 

In August 2021, RBMedia launched Ascent Audio for business focused books. The catalog includes audiobooks from the previous acquisition of Gildan Media and McGraw-Hill Professional. It claimed to be the world's largest catalog of business audiobooks.

In November 2021, RBMedia announced that its property Audiobooks.com, purchased in 2017, was being sold to Storytel for $135 million.

In December 2021, RBMedia acquired the audiobook self-publisher Author’s Republic, including its traditional audiobook subsidiary Novel Audio.

RBMedia purchased German audiobook publisher ABOD in January 2022, with works to be published under the RBmedia Verlag brand.

References

Audiobook companies and organizations
Companies based in Maryland
Calvert County, Maryland
Mass media companies established in 2017
2017 establishments in Maryland
Kohlberg Kravis Roberts companies
2018 mergers and acquisitions